Lost Killers is a 2000 German  crime black comedy film directed by Dito Tsintsadze. It was screened in the Un Certain Regard section at the 2000 Cannes Film Festival. At the 10th Cottbus Film Festival the film won the top prize and at the 2000 Thessaloniki International Film Festival, Misel Maticevic won the award for Best Actor.

Plot
The film is set in a red-light district of Mannheim, Germany and depicts five illegal immigrants on the fringes of society.
Georgian Merab (Lasha Bakradze) and Croatian Branko (Misel Maticevic) have trouble finding employment and end up trying to work as paid contract killers. Their first assignment is to kill a Russian businessman (Viktor Benzler) but Merab does not have the stomach for murder. Branko also sells drugs in order to earn a living for himself and his dying mother Dusica (Dito Tsintsadze).
Their lives become intertwined with three other outsiders. 
Carlos, a former martial artist (Elie James Blezes) from Haiti wants to sell one of his kidneys to get enough money to move to Australia. He also earns some money as a street musician. Lan (Nicole Seelig) from Vietnam who works as a cheap prostitute longs for expensive dental work which would fix her bad teeth. Her colleague Maria (Franca Kastein) who was abused as a child dreams of finding her soul-mate.

Cast
 Lasha Bakradze - Merab
 Misel Maticevic - Branco
 Elie James Blezes - Carlos
 Nicole Seelig - Lan
  - Maria (as Franca Kastein Ferreira Alves)
 Franz Koller - Franz
 Michael Holz - Flory
 Dito Tsintsadze - Dusica
 Athanasios Cosmadakis - Kostos (as Athanasios 'Saki' Cosmadakis)
 Viktor Benzler - Russian businessman
 Oliver Rischak - Drug dealer
 Jan Zagorski - Hotel porter
 Paul Haworth - Hippie in a car

Reception
Review by Lisa Nesselson from Variety: "In "Lost Killers," an informal quintet of lovable losers pursue dubious schemes to improve their lives as illegal immigrants in Mannheim, Germany. Sly, off-kilter humor balances the essential tawdriness of prostitution, drug dealing and contract killing, resulting in a strikingly shot and surprisingly amusing slice of life. Georgian helmer Dito Tsintsadze's modest ode to joy in unlikely places is a nice bet for fests as well as a showcase for its multicultural cast."

References

External links

2000 films
2000s crime comedy-drama films
German crime comedy-drama films
2000s German-language films
Films directed by Dito Tsintsadze
2000 comedy films
2000 drama films
2000s German films